The Face Men Thailand Season 2 began audition on 9 June 2018 in Yangon, Myanmar and 11 August 2018 at Kantana studio, Bangkok, Thailand. Lukkade Metinee returned as  Master Mentor, the very first new role for the show. Moo Asava was reprised his roles as mentor again. Sonia Couling, one of The Face Thailand All Stars's mentor, and Toni Rakkaen were the new mentors in this season. Antoine Pinto, a Muay Thai Kickboxer, served as host. The season premiered on 7 October 2018.

Auditions

Myanmar Audition 
First casting began in Yangon, Myanmar on 9 June 2018 under “The Face Men Thailand Season 2 Myanmar Audition" with Piyarat Kaljareuk (Vice President of Kantana Group & Executive Producer The Face Thailand) and Sonia Couling as judges. The winner of the audition and runners-up will go to Bangkok, Thailand to get a chance to audition again with Thai and international male models.

 Winner - Wai Zin "Hernfah"
 1st Runner Up - Zin Bo Chan
 2nd Runner Up - Myat Min San

Thailand Audition 
Casting calls for Thai and any nationality will be held in Bangkok, Thailand at Kantana Studio Ratchada on Saturday 11 August 2018.

Contestants
(ages stated are at the start of shooting)

The contestant was originally eliminated in episode 3-8 but returned to the competition by transferred into team master mentor, able to attend Master Class, but can't do Campaign.

Episodes

Episode 1 : Casting 
First aired 7 October 2018

Team Moo : Poppy, Bom, Film, Pon, Paul and Kim G.
Team Sonia : Luis, Kat-chan, Ruj, Kim B., Andy and Golf
Team Toni : Best, William, Mooyong, Dom, Bank and Ryota

Episode 2 : Equality By Wonjin
First aired 14 October 2018
 Winning coach and team: Toni Rakkaen
 Bottom two: Pon Charungphokhakon and Kim Bohman
 Eliminated: None
 Special guest: Victor Pinto, Sophida Kanchanarin & Gene Kasidit
 Featured photographer: Nat Prakobsantisuk

Episode 3 : Huawei Nova 3i Selfie Revolution 
First aired 21 October 2018
 Winning coach and team: Toni Rakkaen
 Bottom two: Bom Thanawatyanyong and Ruj Mitwatthana
 Eliminated: Ruj Mitwatthana

Episode 4 : The Next Level of Clean with Comfort
First aired 28 October 2018
 Winning coach and team: Sonia Couling
 Bottom two: Pon Charungphokhakon and Best Phanthakoengamon
 Eliminated: Pon Charungphokhakon
 Featured photographer: Punsiri Siriwetchapun

Episode 5 : The Destiny with Huawei Nova 3i 
First aired 4 November 2018
 Winning coach and team: Moo Asava 
 Bottom two: William Aherne and Golf Suphromin
 Eliminated: William Aherne
 Special mentor: Chermarn Boonyasak
 Special guest: Korawan Lodsantia, Chayada Visuttipranee & Peemsinee Sawangkla

Episode 6 : Extraordinary Journeys with Bangkok Airways 
First aired 11 November 2018
 Winning coach and team: Moo Asava 
 Bottom four: Golf Suphromin, Dom Petchthamrongchai, Best Phanthakoengamon and Paul de Bodt
 Eliminated by Master Mentor: Golf Suphromin, Dom Petchthamrongchai, Best Phanthakoengamon and Paul de Bodt
 Special guest: Kanachai Bencharongkul
 Featured photographer: Nat Sumontemee

Episode 7 : Preface of Final Walk 
First aired 18 November 2018
 Winning coach and team: Moo Asava 
 Bottom two: Ryota Omi and Kim Bohman
 Eliminated: Kim Bohman
 Special guest: Cindy Bishop & Sombatsara Thirasaroj

Episode 8 : Chasing The Sense of Perfume You Can Wear 
First aired 25 November 2018

 Returned in original team: William Aherne
 Winning coach and team:  Moo Asava
 Bottom two: Mooyong Bunsomsuk and Kat-chan Hada
 Eliminated: Mooyong Bunsomsuk
 Special guest: Praya Lundberg

Episode 9 :  Accelerate Together with Toyota C–HR Adidas
First aired 2 December 2018

 Winning coach and team:  Moo Asava
 Winning campaign:  Kim Goodburn
 Final three was chosen by Coach:  Luis Meza, Ryota Omi & Poppy Anomakiti
 Fourth was chosen by coach from winning campaign team:  Kim Goodburn 
 Eliminated:  Kat-chan Hada, Andy Harris, Film Uengwanit, Bom Thanawatyanyong, Bank Heamtan & William Aherne 
 Special mentor: Pitt Karchai
 Special guest: Arthur Apichaht Gagnaux

Episode 10 : Final Walk 

First aired 9 December 2018
 Final four:  Luis Meza,  Poppy Anomakiti,  Kim Goodburn & Ryota Omi 
 Winning campaign: Luis Meza
 The Face Men Thailand: Luis Meza
 Winning coach and team: Sonia Couling

Summaries

Elimination Table

 The contestant was part of the winning team for the episode.
 The contestant was at risk of elimination.
 The contestant was eliminated from the competition.
 The contestant was eliminated from the competition by master mentor.
 The contestant was part of the winning team for the episode, but eliminated from the competition by master mentor.
 The contestant was originally eliminated but returned to the competition by transferred into team master mentor, able to attend Master Class, but can't do Campaign.
 The contestant was originally eliminated but returned to the competition by transferred into team master mentor, able to attend Master Class and invited as guest in Campaign.
 The contestant was originally eliminated but returned to the competition by transferred into team master mentor, able to attend Master Class, and returned to the competition in original team by master mentor
 The contestant was a Runner-Up.
 The contestant won The Face Men.

 Episode 1 was the casting episode. The final eighteen were divided into individual teams of six as they were selected.
 In episode 2, team Toni won the campaign. Moo nominated Pon while Sonia nominated Kim B. for the elimination. Toni didn't eliminate both of them.
 In episode 5, Mentor Sonia can not to do campaign, But Ploy Chermarn take on the role Sonia Couling.
 From episodes 3–9, Every eliminated contestant will be transferred into team master Lukkade. They will be able to attend Master Class, but can't do Campaign.
 In episode 6, team Moo won the campaign. Sonia nominated Golf, Toni nominated Dom and Best while Moo nominated Paul for eilimination. Master Lukkade eliminated all of them.
 In episode 8, William returned to the competition in original team by master mentor
 In episode 9, Pitt Karchai replaced Toni who was occupied by his event, but after the campaign, Toni was back to the elimination process as Team Toni's mentor. After that, Kim G. won the campaign individually, automatically advancing into the finale. Sonia, Toni and Moo were allowed to choose any one contestant to advance into the finale from the remaining ten models. Sonia chose Luis, Toni chose Ryota, and Moo chose Poppy. Kat-chan, Andy, Film, Bom, Bank and William were eliminated.
 In episode 10, Luis won the campaign individually, however there was no elimination so all contestants were put through to the final runway.

Campaigns
 Episode 1: First Impression, Runway and Self Administered 'Transformations' (Casting)
 Episode 2: Equality by  Wonjin
 Episode 3: Huawei Nova 3i Selfie Revolution
 Episode 4: The Next Level of Clean with Comfort
 Episode 5: The Destiny with Huawei Nova 3i
 Episode 6: Extraordinary Journeys with Bangkok Airways
 Episode 7: Preface of Final Walk
 Episode 8: Chasing The Sense of Perfume You Can Wear
 Episode 9: Accelerate Together with Toyota C–HR Adidas
 Episode 10: Acting and Final Walk

Notes

 Dom was selected by master mentor and 3 mentors but master Lukkade selected him into team Toni.
 Luis didn't get selected by 3 mentors but master Lukkade selected him into team Sonia.
 Poppy was selected by master mentor, mentor Sonia and Moo, but master Lukkade selected him into team Moo.

References 

Thailand
2018 Thai television seasons
The Face Thailand seasons